Jean Thureau (22 June 1927 - 3 March 1995) was a French hurdler. He competed in the men's 400 metres hurdles at the 1952 Summer Olympics.

References

External links
 

1927 births
1995 deaths
Athletes (track and field) at the 1952 Summer Olympics
French male hurdlers
Olympic athletes of France
20th-century French people